Convicts is a 1991 film directed by Peter Masterson. It stars Robert Duvall and Lukas Haas. It is based on the Horton Foote play The Orphan's Home.

Summary
A boy works with convicts on the sugarcane plantation of a senile Civil War veteran in 1902 Texas.

Cast
 Robert Duvall as Soll Gautier
 Lukas Haas as Horace Robedaux
 James Earl Jones as Ben Johnson
 Starletta DuPois as Martha Johnson
 Carlin Glynn as Asa

References

External links
 
 

1991 films
Films directed by Peter Masterson
Films set in 1902
Films set in Texas
Films with screenplays by Horton Foote
1991 drama films
1990s English-language films